Ben Rosenthal may refer to:

 Benjamin Stanley Rosenthal (1923–1983), Congressman from New York
 Ben Rosenthal (baseball) (born 1979), American baseball coach
 Ben Rosenthal (politician) (1898-1953), American politician in California